Filipina singer Nina has released seven studio albums, one live album, three compilation albums, one remix album and forty-three singles. In 2002, Nina released her debut album, Heaven, which became one of the best-selling albums of 2003 in the Philippines, certifying double Platinum by the Philippine Association of the Record Industry (PARI). The album earned two consecutive number-one singles on the Philippine charts, the first being "Jealous", which peaked at number one for three weeks, and was succeeded by her own rendition of "Foolish Heart". Heaven also made her the only female artist in OPM history to have five Top 5 singles from an album. In December 2003, Nina released her second album, Smile. Lead single, "Make You Mine", peaked at number one in the country, making her the first and only female OPM artist to have three number-one singles in a span of one year. Smile failed to match the commercial success of its predecessor, but it maintained her status as a platinum-selling artist.

In 2005, Nina released her most successful album, Nina Live!, to date, which became the fourth best-selling album in OPM history, eventually selling over 300,000 copies and certifying Diamond in the Philippines. The album reached six times Platinum status within the year of its release, making it one of the fastest-selling albums in the country. It also holds the record for best-selling live album and best-selling Filipino album of the 2000s. Nina Live! earned three number-one singles and yielded her most successful song, "Love Moves in Mysterious Ways", which became the longest running number one song in OPM history, spending twelve consecutive weeks atop the Philippine charts. The preceding and succeeding singles, "I Don't Want to Be Your Friend" and "Through the Fire", topped the charts as well.

In 2006, Nina released her self-titled third studio album, which became her most awarded album to date, earning eight Awit Award nominations and certifying double Platinum by the PARI. The album's second single, "Someday", became her seventh number-one single, topping the charts for eight consecutive weeks. In 2007, Nina re-released the album under the title Nina Featuring the Hits of Barry Manilow, which earned two Top 3 singles and was certified Platinum in the Philippines. In 2008, she released her fourth studio album, Nina Sings the Hits of Diane Warren, a cover album which debuted and peaked at number one in the country for six consecutive weeks. Like Nina Live!, the album was certified Gold a week after its commercial release. Its lead single, "I Don't Want to Miss a Thing", became her ninth number-one single in the country. Nina's fifth studio album, Renditions of the Soul, was released in 2009. The album became a commercial success, certifying Platinum in the Philippines in July 2010 despite minimal promotion. Also in 2009, Nina was named as the best-selling female recording artist by the Guillermo Mendoza Memorial Scholarship Foundation. In October 2010, Warner released a 4-disc box set compilation of Nina's singles, entitled Diamond: Greatest Hits 2002-2010. Since her debut in the music industry, Nina has sold over a million records in the Philippines to date.

Albums

Studio albums

Live albums

Compilation albums

Remix albums

Re-releases

Singles

As lead artist

As featured artist

Promotional singles

Soundtracks

Guest appearances

See also
 Nina Girado videography
 List of best-selling albums in the Philippines

Notes

References

Discography
Discographies of Filipino artists
Pop music discographies
Rhythm and blues discographies